Winship may refer to:

Surname
Albert Edward Winship (1845–1933), American educator and educational journalist; father of Laurence and George
Blanton Winship (1869–1947), American military lawyer, veteran of the Spanish–American War and World War I
Christopher Winship (born 1950), Diker-Tishman Professor of sociology at Harvard University
Elizabeth Winship (1921–2011), writer and columnist; wife of Thomas
George Parker Winship (1871–1952), American librarian and author; son of Albert
Ginger Winship, fictional character in Much Obliged, Jeeves, a comic novel by P. G. Wodehouse
Jonathan Winship (1780–1843), American 19th-century sailor and entrepreneur
Laurence L. Winship (1890–1975), American newspaper editor; son of Albert, father of Thomas
Robert Winship (1834–1899), 19th century Atlanta businessman
Ted Winship (1900–1929), English professional football left back
Thomas Winship (1920–2002), American newspaper editor; son of Laurence, husband of Elizabeth
Tommy Winship (1890–1976), English footballer
Vanessa Winship (born 1960), British photographer

Given name
Alden Winship Clausen (1923–2013), President of the World Bank from 1981 to 1986
Winship C. Connor (1848–1921), businessman, mayor of Dallas
Margaret Winship Eytinge (1832–1916), New York-based author
Robert Winship Woodruff (1889–1985), president of The Coca-Cola Company 1923–1954

Geography
Winship Point, Potter Cove, King George Island, South Shetland Islands

See also
Charles Winship House, historic house in Wakefield, Massachusetts
Winship Cancer Institute, nonprofit cancer research and patient care center in Atlanta, Georgia
Winship Elementary School in Boston, Massachusetts, United States
In re Winship, 397 U.S. 358 (1970), United States Supreme Court decision



Disambiguation pages with surname-holder lists